Autocharis egenula is a moth in the family Crambidae. It was described by E. Hering in 1901. It is found on Sulawesi.

References

Moths described in 1901
Odontiinae
Moths of Indonesia